Kane Gregory Thompson (born 9 January 1982) is a New Zealand-born rugby union coach and former player who played for the Samoa national rugby union team. He played professionally for several teams in New Zealand and in Europe during his 19-year playing career. He retired from playing in 2021, and has since served as head coach for NOLA Gold in Major League Rugby (MLR).

Playing career

Thompson debuted for the Highlanders in 2006. He showed he was well capable of stepping up to the higher level and he had a strong 2006 season for Southland. In 2007 he represented Manu Samoa at the Rugby World Cup and went on to represent U.S. Dax in the Top 14 in France. Kane represented Samoa at the 2011 Rugby World Cup before taking up a contract with Chiefs in 2012, who became Super Rugby champions in that year.

He played for the Chiefs in the 2012 Super Rugby, joining national teammate Mahonri Schwalger.

On 17 July 2014, Thompson signed for Newcastle Falcons who compete in the English Aviva Premiership from the 2014–15 season.

Kane also represented Samoa in the 2015 Rugby World Cup in England.

Coaching
Thompson served as player-coach for NOLA Gold in Major League Rugby, serving as forwards and defensive coach. He was named head coach in December 2021 ahead of the 2022 season.

References

External links
Newcastle Falcons Profile
Chiefs profile
IRB profile
itsrugby.co.uk profile

1982 births
Living people
Yokohama Canon Eagles players
Chiefs (rugby union) players
Expatriate rugby union players in England
Expatriate rugby union players in France
Expatriate rugby union players in Japan
Expatriate rugby union players in the United States
Hawke's Bay rugby union players
Highlanders (rugby union) players
Manawatu rugby union players
New Orleans Gold players
New Zealand rugby union coaches
New Zealand expatriate rugby union players
New Zealand expatriate sportspeople in England
New Zealand expatriate sportspeople in France
New Zealand expatriate sportspeople in Japan
New Zealand expatriate sportspeople in the United States
New Zealand sportspeople of Samoan descent
Newcastle Falcons players
Rugby union players from Wellington City
Samoa international rugby union players
Southland rugby union players
US Dax players
Wellington rugby union players
Taranaki rugby union players
Rugby union locks